The Brothers Solomon is a 2007 American surrealist comedy film directed by Bob Odenkirk and written by Will Forte. It features Will Arnett and Forte as the titular brothers, who set out to find romantic partners so they can give their comatose father (Lee Majors) a grandchild. Chi McBride, Kristen Wiig, and Malin Åkerman also star in supporting roles.

The film was released in the United States on September 7, 2009, distributed by TriStar Pictures. It received negative reviews from critics and was a box office bomb, grossing $1 million worldwide with a $10 million budget.

Plot
Brothers John Solomon and Dean Solomon have bad luck with women, due largely to their sheltered upbringing. They were raised by their single father, Ed, at an isolated research facility in the Arctic, and did not move to civilization until they were grown men. Despite their social limitations, the brothers are generally good-natured, if naïve, and consider their father the most important person in their life, as they even followed in his footsteps with their geology career. However, their lives are thrown into turmoil when Ed falls into a coma.

The brothers decide that they may be able to get him to wake up by giving him a grandson, the one thing he has always wanted. To make this a reality, the brothers immediately set out to find a woman who can give them a baby. The brothers have disastrous results in their initial attempts. John proposes marriage to a woman on the first date and when Dean finds a woman who is willing to have a child for them, she is hit by a bus and killed. To keep a better eye on their father, they move him into their home. John is able to use this as an opportunity to talk to his neighbor, Tara, who agrees to watch over their father when they leave the apartment.

The brothers decide to expand their search to include adoption. However, due to the bizarre circumstances, the adoption agency denies the request. They try Craigslist next, and are able to find a surrogate mother named Janine. Janine is a suitable fit, but she has a clingy ex-boyfriend named James, and demands $12,000 for her role. Over the course of the next nine months, the brothers learn how to be responsible parents, and Janine begins to warm up to the bizarre duo. John continues to flirt with Tara, and convinces himself that she is interested.

After a birthing class, Janine realizes that she wants to keep the baby. She tells the brothers the bad news, which culminates in Dean revealing to John that he heard Tara insult John behind his back, thus forcing John to realize that Tara is not interested in him. The two have a major fight, but after a day, the brothers reconcile. The brothers attempt to get Janine to let them raise the child with her by paying for an exorbitantly long sky banner. Janine decides to raise the baby with the two brothers and John tells Tara that he is no longer interested in her.

Soon, the child is born, however it is obvious that the baby is James's, not Dean's. A year passes, and the brothers have gone into business with Janine and James, starting up a store called "Solomon Family Baby-Proofing", which sells safety equipment for new parents. In the corner of the store, their father is kept, still in his coma. After hearing the baby say "grandpa", Ed finally wakes up from his coma and sees his "grandson" for the first time. The brothers are convinced that their adventures led to their father waking up from his coma. Everybody celebrates as one big, happy family.

Cast
 Will Arnett as John Solomon
 Will Forte as Dean Solomon
 Chi McBride as James Coolwell
 Kristen Wiig as Janine Rice
 Malin Åkerman as Tara Anderson
 Lee Majors as Ed Solomon
 Bob Odenkirk as Jim Treacher
 Sam Lloyd as Dr. Spencer
 Charles Chun as Dr. Wong
 Jenna Fischer as Michelle
 Stephanie Courtney as Sara
 Bill Hader as Recumbent Biker
 Derek Waters as Video Store Guy
 Casey Wilson as Fertility Clinic Worker
 Nicole Randall Johnson as Birthing Instructor
 Ashley Johnson as Patricia
 Brian Scolaro as Medical Delivery Man

Reception
The film was a box office bomb, grossing only $1,035,056 out of a $10 million budget.

Reviews were negative. On Rotten Tomatoes, the film received a 16% approval rating, based on 74 reviews, with a weighted average of 3.8/10. The site's consensus reads, "Squandering its impressive cast with poorly-directed gags, The Brothers Solomon is a one-joke film stretched well beyond its limits." On Metacritic, the film received a score of 32 out of 100, based on 17 reviews. However, the film has received a favorable User Submitted Reviews score, which stands at 7.8 out of 10 as of May 2021, based on ratings from 43 users.  On At the Movies with Ebert & Roeper, Richard Roeper claimed he walked out of the film - something he had never done before.

See also 

 Second weekend in box office performance – Biggest second-weekend drops, for other films with similar second-weekend drops

References

External links 

2007 films
American comedy films
2007 comedy films
2000s pregnancy films
American pregnancy films
Films about brothers
Films directed by Bob Odenkirk
Films scored by John Swihart
TriStar Pictures films
Revolution Studios films
2000s English-language films
2000s American films